Akki rotti is a rice-based breakfast item unique to the state of Karnataka, India. Akki rotti means "rice bread" in the native language, Kannada. It is made of rice flour which is mixed with salt and water and kneaded well till the dough gets soft. Sliced onions and carrots, chopped dill leaves, chopped coriander, cumin seeds and sesame seeds can also be added while kneading the dough. Oil is spread over a griddle (tava) or wok and a small amount of the dough is stretched to a thin sheet to cover the entire griddle (rotti). A small amount of oil is spread over it and the griddle is placed over heat till the rotti turns golden brown. Akki rotti is served hot and is eaten along with chutney. A dash of butter or ghee with akki rotti is also preferred. Another way of making akki rotti is to spread the dough over a plantain leaf and then cook it over the griddle with the plantain leaf on the top.

See also
 Cuisine of Karnataka
 Ragi rotti
 Jolada rotti
 Kori rotti
 List of Indian breads
 List of rice dishes

References

Karnataka cuisine
Indian breads